{{Infobox ethnic group
| group            = Bali AgaBaliaga / Bali Mula
| image            = 
| caption          = A Bali Aga man.
| popplace         =  (Bangli, Buleleng and Karangasem Regency)
| languages        = Balinese (Bali Aga dialect), Indonesian
| religions        = Folk Hinduism, Balinese Hinduism and Animism
| related          = Balinese, Javanese, Madurese
| native_name      = 
| native_name_lang = 
}}

The Bali Aga, Baliaga or Bali Mula' are the indigenous people of Bali, predominantly located in the eastern part of the island, in Karangasem. They can also be found in north-western and central regions. Bali Aga people that are referred to as Bali Pergunungan (Mountain Balinese) are those that are located at Trunyan village. For the Trunyan Bali Aga people, the term Bali Aga (Mountain Balinese) is regarded as an insult with an additional meaning of "the mountain people that are fools"; therefore, they prefer the term Bali Mula (lit Original Balinese) instead.

Origin
The original inhabitants of Bali are said to have come from Bedulu village long before the Hindu-Javanese immigration wave. The legend is, there lived the last king of the Pejeng (an old Balinese kingdom), Sri Aji Asura Bumibanten, who had supernatural powers. He could cut off his head without feeling pain and put it back on again. One day, though, his head accidentally fell into a river and was swept away. One of his servants panicked and decided to quickly decapitate a pig and replace the king's head with the animal's head. Embarrassed, the king hid in a tall tower, denying any visitors. A small child discovered the secret and since then, the king became known as Dalem Bedulu, or He-who-changed-head. Another explanation is that the name comes from the name Badahulu or "the village upstream". After the Pejeng kingdom, the Majapahit Empire rose to power.

Culture
The Bali Aga live in isolated areas in the mountains. Their relative isolation compared to the lowland Balinese had preserved some of the original Austronesian element, apparent in the Bali Aga architecture. Tourists wishing to visit certain villages must be careful due to the geography of the area. While visiting, it is also important to be respectful and quietly observe the preserved way of life the Bali Aga have.

In Tenganan, where tourism is more easily embraced and the people are said to be more friendly, a three-day festival called Udaba Sambah is held during the months of June or July. Tenganan prohibits divorce and polygamy, unlike other villages.

Language
The Bali Aga speak their own dialect of the Balinese language. It dates back thousands of years and varies from village to village; the version spoken in the Tenganan village is different from the Trunyan village.

Craftwork
An important part of Bali Aga culture is the complex tie-dye technique used to make Bali's traditional geringsing double ikat. Bali's Tenganan village is the only village that today still produces geringsing.

In geringsing, both the cotton warp and weft threads are carefully dyed and cross-dyed before weaving; the finished pattern only emerges as the cloth is woven. According to textile expert John Guy, "the ancestry of Balinese geringsing is far from clear, although some cloths display the unmistakable influence of patola", the silk double ikats produced in Gujarat during the height of the Spice Trade (16-17C). Many of these imported cloths became inspiration for later locally-made textiles, but one theory is that the Balinese-made cloths were exported to India and copied there for production to Asian markets. Many have unique Hindu motifs such as a bird's eye view of a mandala with a sacred center from which everything radiates. Others feature designs clearly inspired by patola, for example a design known as the frangipani flower (jepun). The palette of geringsing is typically red, neutral, and black. Geringsing are regarded as sacred cloths, "ascribed supernatural properties, especially to assist in forms of healing, including exorcism." Gering means decease and sing'' means no.

See also

Ancestor worship
Animism
Balinese people
Hinduism in Indonesia
Pandanus

References

External links
 http://www.bali-indonesia.com/culture/bali-aga.html
 http://www.indo.com/featured_article/bali_aga.html
 https://web.archive.org/web/20080622035053/http://blog.baliwww.com/guides/280/

Ethnic groups in Indonesia
Indigenous peoples of Southeast Asia